Arizona Terrors is a 1942 American Western film directed by George Sherman and written by Doris Schroeder and Taylor Caven. The film stars Don "Red" Barry, Lynn Merrick, Al St. John, Reed Hadley, John Maxwell and Frank Brownlee. The film was released on January 13, 1942, by Republic Pictures.

Plot

Cast 
 Don "Red" Barry as Jim Bradley
 Lynn Merrick as Lila Adams
 Al St. John as Hardtack
 Reed Hadley as Jack Halliday aka Don Pedro de Berendo
 John Maxwell as Larry Madden
 Frank Brownlee as Henry Adams
 Rex Lease as Henchman Briggs
 Lee Shumway as Sheriff Wilcox
 Tom London as Rancher Wade

References

External links
 

1942 films
1940s English-language films
American Western (genre) films
1942 Western (genre) films
Republic Pictures films
Films directed by George Sherman
American black-and-white films
1940s American films